John Stewart "Pop" Corkhill (April 11, 1858 – April 4, 1921) was an American professional baseball player. Corkhill excelled as a defensive player, winning five fielding titles in his career.

Biography
Corkhill was born in Parkesburg, Pennsylvania on April 11, 1858. He began his Major League career in the American Association with the Cincinnati Reds in 1883.  He served as the Reds' right fielder for four seasons, leading American Association outfielders in fielding twice.  In 1887, he moved to center field and played there regularly for two seasons, winning two more fielding titles.  As a batter, Corkhill had a knack for driving in runs, finishing 2nd in the league in RBI in 1886.  He also pitched on multiple occasions, serving as a relief pitcher at a time when relievers were not commonplace.

Corkhill finished the 1888 season with the Brooklyn Bridegrooms after the team purchased his contract from Cincinnati.  He played two seasons as Brooklyn's center fielder, and earned two league championships with the club, an AA championship in 1889 and a National League championship in 1890 after the club switched leagues.

Corkhill returned to the American Association in 1891 and began the year with the Philadelphia Athletics.  He left the team in mid-season and returned to the NL to finish the year, playing a single game with the Reds before joining the Pittsburgh Pirates.  He played for parts of two seasons with the Pirates, before retiring after being hit in the head by a pitch from Ed Crane.

Corkhill died after an operation in Pennsauken, New Jersey on April 4, 1921.

References

External links

1858 births
1921 deaths
Major League Baseball right fielders
Major League Baseball center fielders
Baseball players from Pennsylvania
Cincinnati Reds players
Brooklyn Bridegrooms players
Philadelphia Athletics (AA 1891) players
Pittsburgh Pirates players
Philadelphia Phillies (minor league) players